The 1967–68 Serie A season was the 34th season of the Serie A, the top level of ice hockey in Italy. Four teams participated in the league, and SG Cortina won the championship by defeating HC Diavoli Milano in the final.

Regular season

Final
 SG Cortina - HC Diavoli Milano 2:1 (1:2, 3:0, 7:5)

External links
 Season on hockeytime.net

1967–68 in Italian ice hockey
Serie A (ice hockey) seasons
Italy